Damian Gąska (born 24 November 1996) is a Polish professional footballer who plays as a midfielder for Górnik Łęczna.

Club career
On 7 September 2020, he joined Radomiak Radom on a season-long loan with an option to buy.

References

External links
 Profile at FuPa.net
 

1996 births
Footballers from Warsaw
Living people
Polish footballers
Poland under-21 international footballers
Association football midfielders
SpVgg Unterhaching players
SpVgg Unterhaching II players
Wigry Suwałki players
Śląsk Wrocław players
Radomiak Radom players
Górnik Łęczna players
3. Liga players
Ekstraklasa players
I liga players
II liga players
III liga players
Polish expatriate footballers
Polish expatriate sportspeople in Germany
Expatriate footballers in Germany